Dr. Mehemed Fehmy Agha (Mykolayiv, 1896  - Pennsylvania, May 1978) was a Russian-born Turkish designer, art director, and pioneer of modern American publishing.  He was instrumental in defining the role of the magazine art director and delivering the full force of European avant garde experimentation to the pages of Vogue, Vanity Fair, and House & Garden, the Condé Nast publishing company's flagship magazines in the United States. §

Early life and education

Agha was born in the Russian Empire (now Ukraine) to a family of Turkish descent.  His education ranged broadly from a degree in economics from the Emperor Peter the Great Polytechnic Institute in Kiev to a degree in Oriental languages in Paris. He then pursued training in the arts, and achieved proficiencies in photography, typography, and the sciences.

Career

In 1928 he became the art director of Vogue Berlin. Agha quickly rose to prominence at the Paris and Berlin offices of Vogue.  His inventive layouts came to the attention of Condé Montrose Nast himself who persuaded Agha to take over the art direction of the American edition of Vogue in 1929.  When Dr. Mehemed Fehmy Agha arrived at Vogues New York City offices in 1929, he ignited a design revolution when he revamped the magazine—as well as its sister publications Vanity Fair and House & Garden.

Development and theory

In fashion publications, Agha adjusted the graphics, simplified layout and imposed a close relationship between text and images. Agha stripped down Vogue's old-fashioned appearance, favoring Art Deco curves and the clean lines of Constructivism. He traded italic lettering for forward-leaning sans serif fonts like Futura, and removed all extraneous design elements from the pages—the borders around photos, column rules, sidebars—while synchronizing the magazine's look with the latest out of avant-garde Europe. During his career, Agha widened Vogue's margins to such an extent that the white space on either side of the page left enough “room for your laundry list," as one wit put it. He designed the first ever double-page spreads, and the first full-bleed images, printing photographs without any borders at all, right over the edge of the page. Agha also involved himself in every aspect of the editorial process. Beyond good design, “you must get modern material first if you intend to publish a really modern magazine," he said in 1930. Vanity Fair's urbane editor, Frank Crowninshield, noted that Agha expanded so rapidly that “an additional floor had to be engaged in the Graybar Building in order to prevent him from bulging out of the windows, growing through the roof, or occupying the elevator shafts.” His responsibilities soon came to include Vanity Fair, as well as, the home-style journal House & Garden. Agha incorporated photographs by Edward Steichen, Carl Van Vechten, and Edward Weston, as well as the pictorial feature.

Agha left Condé Nast in 1943 and became a sought-after graphic arts consultant for various companies including publishers and department stores. He became president of both the Art Directors Club (1935) and AIGA (1953–55) and became known as an arbiter of good taste in design. In a tribute published by PM Magazine in August 1939, William Golden wrote about the lofty expectations Agha placed on his designers: "Agha's demands seem so simple. Make something legible, present it logically and make it look somehow luxurious... in a way that he will like. So they devise not merely one version of how they think a page should look, but ten, or twenty, or forty... And for sheer productivity this method is unequalled. As for those bales of rejected layouts that have never seen the light of day; I don't think they are completely wasted. Some day, a less jaded scholar of the Graphic Arts will unearth them and discover again the amazing amount of original and exciting work that was stimulated by the man who knew too much to like anything."—DP

References

Contributors

1934-1942. "M. F. Agha." Dr. Leslie Project. http://www.drleslie.com/Contributors/agha.shtml.

Hall of Fame 1972. "M. F. Agha." The Art Directors Club. http://www.adcglobal.org/archive/hof/1972/?id=293.

"The Man Who Knew Too Much," by William Golden. PM Magazine. Vol. 5, no. 2 (Aug./Sept. 1939).http://library.rit.edu/gda/content/educational

1896 births
1978 deaths
Expatriates from the Russian Empire in France
Emigrants from the Russian Empire to the United States
American designers
American art directors
Condé Nast people
Vogue (magazine) people
Vanity Fair (magazine) people
AIGA medalists